Television in the Philippines was introduced in October 1953 upon the first commercial broadcast made by Alto Broadcasting System (now ABS-CBN), making the Philippines the first Southeast Asian country and the second in Asia to do so. Even before that, during the late 1940s, a number of academic experiments had been done and replicated by Filipino engineers and students.

From 1975 to 1978, the Sinag Awards were given by the Philippine Academy for Television Arts and Sciences (PATAS). The Star Awards for Television are the oldest existing television awards in the country; they are handed out annually by the Philippine Movie Press Club and are voted by the press.

The Philippines has no public broadcasting television network.

History

The early years (1946–1959)
James Lindenberg, an American engineer dubbed the "father of Philippine television," began assembling transmitters and established Bolinao Electronics Corporation (BEC) on June 13, 1946. The company was named after his wife's hometown of Bolinao, Pangasinan. Three years later, he was the first to apply for a license in Philippine Congress to establish a television station. After a year, on June 14, 1950, his request was granted. Due to the scarcity of raw materials and strict import control since 1948, he was compelled to branch into radio broadcasting instead.

Lindenberg's attempt to put up a television station did not go to waste. Judge Antonio Quirino, the brother of then-Philippine President Elpidio Quirino, had been trying to get a license from Congress that would allow him to put up a television station. The Congress, however, denied him from getting such license for the fear that he might use it as vehicles for propaganda for his brother who was then running for a second term in the presidential elections of 1953. Because of this, he bought a 70% share in BEC, which earned him to indirect control a television franchise. He changed the name of BEC to Alto Broadcasting System (ABS), after the names of its new owners, Aleli and Judge Antonio Quirino. Lindenberg continued to be a co-owner and served as the general manager.

Before the television station was formally launched, it faced several obstacles. The Central Bank, for instance, refused to grant Quirino dollar credit from the bank, saying that the said venture was too risky. For this reason, Quirino asked help from his friend Marvin Gray, whose family was a friend of David Sarnoff, then president of Radio Corporation of America (RCA). Through the intervention of Gray, Quirino was able to get assistance from RCA.

Prior to the first telecast, Quirino initiated the importation of 120 television sets through the 60,000 pesos loan that he received from the owner of Joe's Electric, who was, in turn, became the first to be bestowed with the right to sell television sets in the country.

Finally, on October 23, 1953, Quirino marked the first official television broadcast in the Philippines with the launching of ABS' DZAQ-TV Channel 3 (DZAQ-TV 3). With the help of RCA, four men underwent technical training in the United States. These were Arcadio Carandang, Romualdo Carballo, Harry Chaney and Jose Navarro.

The ABS studio was a makeshift barn along Florentino Torres Street in Manila. With the transmitter acquired from RCA, the telecasts were received clearly not only in Manila but also in the neighboring provinces. Except for the four engineers who was sent to the US for training, most of the personnel at ABS learned TV operations on the job. The first transmitter for the station was located in San Juan.

DZAQ-TV 3 started out on a four-hour-a-day schedule, from six to ten in the evening. Although ABS was able to round up 52 advertisers for the premier telecast, selling spots for regular programming had proven to be difficult since buying radio ad spots was more cost-effective for advertisers. During this time, TV sets costs less than an automobile, and TV reception depended on electrical power, which was not always available.

The programs aired at that time were usually borrowed films from the foreign embassies, imported old cowboy movies, and actual coverage of a variety of events. When the station ran out of presenting any new feature, stage plays were transported to television. In 1953, less than a month after the first telecast, Father James Reuter , who had radio and television training, produced the first play on Philippine television entitled Cyrano de Bergerac. The three-hour-long play was aired live and all the talents were students.

In the beginning, Philippine TV networks would buy the rights of airing mediocre American TV programs and serials since it was cheaper than producing local shows. In order to entice advertisers, as well as to encourage increased viewership, simultaneous airing of programs on radio and television resorted to promotional gimmicks. Many popular radio shows, including, Tawag ng Tanghalan, Kuwentong Kutsero, and Student Canteen, started their life on TV this way.

In 1955, Radiowealth Inc., a radio manufacturer, began manufacturing television sets. Other local outfits such as, Carlsound and Rehco, also started setting up assembly plants. In 1958, the high taxes previously imposed on imported television shows were removed, which made American shows less expensive than locally produced live programming. In April 1955, Chronicle Broadcasting Network (CBN) was established as a radio medium in 1956 by businessmen Eugenio and Fernando Lopez. In the same year, CBN acquired ABS from Quirino, and merged the two companies under Bolinao Electronics Corporation.

With the establishment of DZXL-TV Channel 9 on April 19, 1958, the Lopez brothers controlled the ABS and CBN television channels.

In 1958, the combined ABS (DZAQ-TV Channel 3) and CBN (DZXL-TV Channel 9) television stations moved to their new studios in Roxas Boulevard, Pasay and the ABS radio facilities moved to the Chronicle Building in the Intramuros District of Manila, the home building of the CBN Radio studios.

Rising popularity (1960–1972)
At the turn of the next decade, TV sets became the most sellable appliance in the urban areas. Also within this period, other VHF TV stations opened. These include DZTV-TV (established on March 1, 1960, by Inter-Island Broadcasting Corporation (IBC), owned by Dick Baldwin and later Andrés Soriano, Sr. of San Miguel Corporation), DZTM-TV (established on June 19, 1960, by Associated Broadcasting Corporation (ABC), owned by Chino Roces, the publisher of The Manila Times), DZBB-TV (established on October 29, 1961, by Republic Broadcasting System (RBS), owned by Robert Stewart), DZFM-TV (established in 1961 by the Philippine Broadcasting Service of the Philippine government, now defunct), DZRH-TV (established on April 11, 1962, by the Manila Broadcasting Company (MBC), owned by Manuel "Manolo" Elizalde Sr.), and DZKB-TV (established on October 15, 1969, by Kanlaon Broadcasting System (KBS), owned by Roberto Benedicto).  Among the top rated programs in the 1960s were The Nida-Nestor Show, Buhay Artista, and Pancho Loves Tita. Another local show that has had a prevailing top rating is Tawag ng Tanghalan, the amateur singing contest hosted by Lopito and Patsy.

BEC's DZAQ-TV Channel 3, following the success of the first ever locally produced television drama Hiwaga sa Bahay na Bato in 1961, staged in 1963 the first-ever test television broadcasts in color using the NTSC system of the Radio Corporation of America, and would begin to broadcast in color in 1966.

On February 1, 1967, the corporate name of BEC was changed to ABS-CBN Broadcasting Corporation (later known simply as ABS-CBN Corporation since May 27, 2010 although the ABS-CBN Broadcasting Corporation name is still used alternatively nowadays). Also, during this year, Radiowealth Inc. pioneered in the production of 19-, 21- and 25-inch models of color TV sets. Moreover, it was favored by advertisers like Procter and Gamble, Philippine Refining Company, Colgate-Palmolive, Del Rosario Brothers, and Caltex.

In 1969, Filipinos witnessed the live television coverage of the Apollo 11 historic moon landing. It was the first live telecast via satellite in the country. Channels 5, 7 and 13 tied up for the said project, while ABS-CBN produced its own color coverage. On November 14, 1969, DZAQ-TV would transfer from channel 3 to channel 2, while its sister station DZXL-TV transferred from channel 9 to channel 4. On October 15, 1969, Kanlaon Broadcasting System (KBS) would launch its television network with DZKB-TV Channel 9, which would broadcast in full color.

By the late 1960s, news and public affairs programs were pioneered by ABS-CBN and ABC. The Big News (in English) on ABC's DZTM-TV Channel 5 and The World Tonight (in English) on ABS-CBN's DZAQ-TV Channel 2 were the first news programs on Philippine television, followed in that same period by Newswatch (in English) of KBS's DZKB-TV Channel 9. ABS-CBN pioneered Filipino language news programming in the primetime slots, with DZAQ-TV Channel 2 having Balita Ngayon and DZXL-TV Channel 4 having Apat na Sulok ng Daigdig, with Orly Mercado as its first presenter.

By 1971, the Philippines, through Radiowealth Inc., had become the third country in the world to manufacture color TV sets. By January 1972, the growth of the Philippine television industry was unstoppable. Aside from ABS-CBN's pioneer satellite broadcasts, stations opened up one after the other in many parts of the country beginning in 1961, when DYCB-TV Channel 3, the pioneer provincial television channel, was opened in Cebu City, bringing four hours of locally produced programming with relays of Manila programs.

Martial law era (1972–1986)
When President Ferdinand Marcos declared martial law in September 1972, he ordered the takeover of media firms. Government troops entered radio and television stations and placed them under military control. All media outlets that were critical of the Marcos administration were padlocked and sequestered.

ABS-CBN was seized by the Office of Press Secretary and the National Media Production Center and DZXL-TV Channel 4 was renamed DWGT-TV Channel 4 (GTV-4), the government-owned channel. KBS, IBC and RBS were later allowed to operate with limited three-month permits. ABS-CBN was seized from the Lopez family and Eugenio Lopez Jr., president of ABS-CBN, was imprisoned. By late 1973, RBS, which was then under blocktimer Philippine Productions, was sold to Felipe Gozon, who was also the lawyer of Robert Stewart, because foreigners were not allowed to own businesses in the Philippines. RBS later changed its name to GMA Radio-Television Arts (now GMA Network), popularly known as GMA-7.

On June 6, 1973, fire destroyed the KBS television studios (originally, the ABS television studios) on Roxas Boulevard, Pasay. Benedicto took control of the ABS-CBN broadcast center on Bohol Avenue, Quezon City. ABS-CBN, as a network, ceased operations for the next 14 years, and its studios became the broadcasting center of Benedicto's KBS and the government's GTV. A year later, ABS-CBN's DZAQ-TV Channel 2 would reopen as DWWX-TV Channel 2 under Benedicto's Banahaw Broadcasting Corporation (BBC). In 1976, GTV-4 began color broadcasts.

The Benedicto networks—BBC, KBS, which became Radio Philippines Network (RPN) in 1975, and IBC—served as vehicles of propaganda for the Marcos government while also broadcasting local and overseas entertainment and sports. In 1979, the Benedicto networks moved to the newly built Broadcast City in Diliman, Quezon City. In the same year, Gregorio Cendaña was named Minister of Information. In 1980, GTV-4 was relaunched as Maharlika Broadcasting System (MBS-4).

Initially, the Department of Public Information (later Ministry of Public Information), reviewed everything that was to be aired on radio and TV set up the rules and regulations. Through other government agencies, policies on ownership, allocation of frequencies, station distribution, and program standards were promulgated. In 1973, the Kapisanan ng mga Brodkaster sa Pilipinas was created, and this agency allowed for self-regulation. A year later, a presidential decree created the Broadcast Media Council.

The 1974 Miss Universe Pageant, the 1975 Muhammad Ali-Joe Frazier heavyweight fight, the 1981 visit of Pope John Paul II was shown worldwide. When Benigno Aquino was assassinated in 1983, it was a small item on television news. During his historic funeral procession, GMA was allowed by only ten seconds of airtime coverage. For most of the late 1970s to the early 1980s, RPN and IBC were the most-watched channels in terms of ratings. However, in the years leading up to the People Power Revolution, GMA – which was the only independent station – managed to beat the Benedicto-owned duopoly and stayed at the position for the next two years.

The martial law era also jump-started the beginnings of satellite broadcasts linking the entire country by ABS-CBN thru trial runs, and soon followed by RPN and MBS which started simulcasts of programs from Manila to the provinces across the country, followed on by GMA and BBC. Cable television also began at this time when the government, through the DPI, created the first true cable television firm, the Benedicto-owned Sining Makulay Inc., in the late 1970s, after years of trials which began in 1969.

In 1984, Imee Marcos, daughter of Ferdinand Marcos, tried to take over the GMA network but she was successfully prevented by GMA executives, Menardo Jimenez and Felipe Gozon. Afterwards, GMA founder Robert Stewart decided to move back to the United States and retire following his utter dissatisfaction with the Marcos regime. The resistance of network leadership would trigger the beginning of the end of Marcos dominance in the television industry, for in the months to come, GMA broke from the pack when it began airing interviews by Benigno's widow, Corazon, in 1985 in the lead up to her presidential campaign and the 1986 snap presidential elections that followed.

In addition the martial law period also jumpstarted an offshoot of current affairs programming – public service and non-news informative programs. GMA Network's Kapwa Ko, Mahal Ko, launched in the fall of 1975, was the first and longest public service TV program in the Philippines. Having helped millions of viewers be aware of medical issues especially among the poor and lower middle class, its success also in providing medical care to indigent and poor families, as well as its revelations on the state of health facilities in far flung communities, led to the creation of the namesake foundation in 1976 and would also begin a new form of Philippine TV programming, that of medical and health related programs that would inform the public on health matters and on living healthy lives. That was the concept that helped BBC-2 launched its on medical affairs TV program in the early 1980s.

Restoration and expansion (1986–2009)

In 1986, in the aftermath of the historic People Power Revolution which ended the 20-long year dictatorship of Marcos that forever altered television history, the Benedicto networks BBC, RPN and IBC were sequestered by the Philippine Commission on Good Government (PCGG). BBC was returned to ABS-CBN through an executive order while RPN and IBC were handed over to the Government Communications Group. ABS-CBN would begin both satellite and international broadcasts (the latter a first for a Philippine TV station) in 1989.

During the latter part of the 1980s as the once insurmountable RPN and IBC suffered from gross mismanagement and financial crisis which took a toll on their ratings, the struggling ABS-CBN surged ahead to be the undisputed number 1 from 1988 onward. GMA, which retained its owners, faced an uphill battle for ratings supremacy as it ended the 80s as the No. 2 network after a brief stint in the lead, though it did maintain its position as a leading player in the industry.

Yet even as it encountered financial troubles, RPN in 1990 broke ahead as the first Philippine station ever to have 24-hour broadcasts. By then, ABS-CBN enjoyed a significant lead over not just GMA, but also the now-faltering RPN and IBC.

MBS became the New TV-4 on February 24, 1986, during the third day of the EDSA Revolution, given the fact that soldiers loyal to President Corazon Aquino and civilian supporters took over the channel's broadcast facilities, but later officially rebranded as the People's Television Network (PTV) in April 1986, and in 2001, it was relaunched as the National Broadcasting Network (NBN), before renaming back to the People's Television Network in 2011, albeit in its current Visayas Avenue studios (which was opened in 1992).

ABC returned to broadcast on February 21, 1992. On August 9, 2008, ABC became TV5.

IBC became a 100% government owned station in the 1990s by virtue of a compromise agreement between PCGG and Roberto Benedicto, management and marketing were returned to the IBC Board of Directors.

In 1998, ZOE TV was finally launched on channel 11. The channel was blocktimed by GMA Network in 2005, and was relaunched as QTV in November. The channel was again relaunched in February 2011, this time as GMA News TV. The channel was blocktimed by ABS-CBN in 2020, and was relaunched as A2Z in October.

During the middle 1990s to 2000s, many UHF stations were launched such as, SBN 21, Studio 23, Net 25, Citynet 27, RJTV 29, CTV 31, UNTV 37, NBC 41 among others.

Philippine shows began to be exported to other Asian and non-Asian countries. After the international success of Philippine television (with many TV dramas being broadcast to many countries), Eat Bulaga! was the first Philippine variety show to be franchised in another country. Its first franchise is Eat Bulaga! Indonesia.

Cable television was, in keeping with the 1987 Constitution and the Aquino government policies, removed as a state responsibility in 1988. In this new atmosphere of privatized cable came what is today the cable firm Sky Cable, created in 1990. 11 years later, Dream Satellite TV began operations as the country's first Direct-broadcast satellite television service, lasting up until 2017.

Shift to digital (2010–present)

In 2007, ABS-CBN Broadcasting Corporation applied a license to the National Telecommunications Commission to operate a digital terrestrial television service in the country.

In 2008, Sky Cable became the first cable network to adopt digital television and Cignal, the country's first digital direct-broadcast satellite television service, made its debut in February 2009.

In 2009, ABS-CBN started to test digital transmission using the European DVB-T standard. On July 11, 2009, ABS-CBN launched Balls HD in Sky Cable, the first ever high-definition television channel in the country. On the same day, Balls also showed the live broadcast of the first ever locally produced coverage of an event in high-definition.

In 2010, Government-controlled television stations in Manila started to test digital transmission using the Japanese ISDB-T standard. In June 2010, NTC announced that the country will formally adopt the ISDB-T standard for digital terrestrial television. In 2011, ABS-CBN started to test ISDB-T transmission and released a trial version of its own set-top boxes manufactured by American communications equipment supplier Atlanta DTH, Inc. GMA Network, TV5, and other commercial television networks also started their own test during this time. However, GMA Network opposed the decision made by NTC and asked NTC to reconsider the European DVB-T for its superior quality.

On February 11, 2015, ABS-CBN Corporation formally launched its ABS-CBN TV Plus service to the public in a ceremony in Quezon City. On October 3, 2015, ABS-CBN became the first national Philippine television network to broadcast in high-definition on cable.

On May 25, 2018, Solar Entertainment Corporation released a DTV product called Easy TV (Philippines) Originally as a mobile TV dongle service, it later distributed digital set-top boxes, as well as freemium digital TV channels. Until its discontinuation on September 30, 2019.

On July 30, 2018, ABS-CBN TVplus conducted free trial of the new set of freemium channels using UHF Channel 16 (485.143 MHz). It includes cable channels from sister company Creative Programs: O Shopping (also aired as overnight programming for ABS-CBN), Jeepney TV, and Myx (which previously has a complimentary channel Myx2 before TVplus launched in 2015). Also included in the lineup are two new exclusive digital channels, Asianovela Channel and Movie Central. Initially, the five new channels will be beamed from Metro Manila, Metro Cebu and Cagayan de Oro, with plans to extend its coverage to existing ABS-CBN DTV stations.

On June 1, 2019, ABS-CBN launched a digital TV dongle called ABS-CBN TVplus Go for Android smartphones. It was initially available in Metro Manila, Cavite, Laguna, Rizal, Bulacan, Pampanga, Benguet, Tarlac, Pangasinan, Nueva Ecija, Batangas, Iloilo, Bacolod, Metro Cebu, Cagayan de Oro and Metro Davao.

On May 5, 2020, ABS-CBN TVplus was affected by the cease-and-desist order (CDO) issued by the National Telecommunications Commission (NTC) and Solicitor General Jose Calida due to the expiration of ABS-CBN's franchise. ABS-CBN's main channel and S+A ceased broadcasting, as well as the regional digital stations operated by ABS-CBN. Some TVplus channels resumed broadcasting on May 8, but in a limited coverage (Metro Manila, Laguna province, Iloilo province, and selected areas of Baguio) through a blocktime agreement with an unnamed third-party broadcast company. On June 1, 2020, Jeepney TV and Asianovela Channel resumed broadcasting and took over the channel spaces of ABS-CBN and S+A respectively.

On June 26, 2020, GMA Network launched its own digital set-top box service, GMA Affordabox to the public.

On June 30, 2020, all the digital channels of ABS-CBN TVplus stopped operations due to the alias cease-and-desist order (ACDO) issued by the National Telecommunications Commission, until it was resumed on 2021 as Digital TV Receiver.

On September 10, 2021, TV5 Network launched its own digital set-top box service, Sulit TV to the public.

Free-to-air television networks

Major television networks
 A2Z: On October 6, 2020, ABS-CBN entered a blocktime agreement with ZOE Broadcasting Network that rebrand ZOE TV into A2Z Channel 11 on October 10. The channel was available in Metro Manila and nearby provinces, and other cable and satellite providers including ABS-CBN's Sky Cable. The channel's programming was included some of the ABS-CBN programs and movies from Kapamilya Channel and its other sister television networks, as well as feature content from ZOE TV's sister station Light TV and its content partners CBN Asia and Trinity Broadcasting Network.
 GMA Network: Launched on October 29, 1961, by American journalist Robert Stewart under the name Republic Broadcasting System (RBS), it was the fifth television station launched in the Philippines. The network was shutdown on September 23, 1972, due to martial law but returned in December of the same year after it was allowed by the government. In 1974, RBS changed its name to GMA Radio-Television Arts after the takeover by the new management by the triumvirate composed of Gilberto Duavit Sr., Menardo Jimenez, and Felipe Gozon. It eventually became one of the top stations in the country. The network was rebranded as GMA Rainbow Satellite Network in 1992 before it went adopted its current name as GMA Network in 1995.
 TV5: Launched on June 19, 1960, by Chino Roces of The Manila Times as ABC, it was the fourth television station launched in the Philippines. On September 23, 1972, ABC was one of the networks forcefully shut down by then-President Ferdinand Marcos due to the implementation of martial law. On February 21, 1992, ABC returned on television and became the fastest-growing network. On August 9, 2008, the network was relaunched as TV5. The network is currently owned by PLDT's media arm, MediaQuest Holdings of Manuel V. Pangilinan.

Government-owned television networks
 Intercontinental Broadcasting Corporation (IBC): is a Philippine-based media company and VHF television network of the Government Communications Group under the Presidential Communications Office (PCO). IBC, along with sister stations Radio Philippines Network and sister media companies People's Television Network and Philippine Broadcasting Service, forms the media arm of the PCO. Its studios, offices and broadcast facilities are located at the IBC Compound, Lot 3-B, Capitol Hills Drive cor. Zuzuarregui Street, Barangay Matandang Balara, Diliman, Quezon City.
 People's Television Network (PTV): is the flagship state broadcaster owned by the Government of the Philippines. Founded in 1974, PTV is the main brand of People's Television Network, Inc. (PTNI), one of the attached agencies under the Presidential Communications Office (PCO). PTV, along with sister media companies Radio Philippines Network (minority-owned) and Intercontinental Broadcasting Corporation, and radio network Philippine Broadcasting Service, forms the media arm of the PCO. Its head office, studios and transmitter are located at Broadcast Complex, Visayas Avenue, Barangay Vasra, Diliman, Quezon City.
 Radio Philippines Network (RPN) (20% minority share; currently carries CNN Philippines): is a Filipino-based media company based in Quezon City. It is the flagship media property of Nine Media Corporation of the ALC Group of Companies; along with the Government Communications Group under the Presidential Communications Office (PCO), and Far East Managers and Investors Inc., owned by the family of company founder Roberto Benedicto under the name Kanlaon Broadcasting System (KBS), among others, as major shareholders. RPN, along with sister stations Intercontinental Broadcasting Corporation and sister media companies People's Television Network and Philippine Broadcasting Service, forms the media arm of the PCO. The network's main offices and transmitter is located at RPN Compound, Panay Avenue, Brgy. South Triangle, Diliman also in Quezon City.
 CNN Philippines: is a free-to-air, commercial broadcast, cable and satellite television network in the Philippines. It is owned and operated by Nine Media Corporation, together with Radio Philippines Network (RPN) as the main content provider, under license from Warner Bros. Discovery. Replacing 9TV, CNN Philippines was launched on March 16, 2015. CNN Philippines is the fifth local franchise of CNN in Asia, after CNN Indonesia, CNN Türk, CNN Arabic and CNN-IBN (now CNN-News18 in India).
 Salaam TV: is a Philippine government-owned Islamic channel owned by the Presidential Communications Office through the People's Television Network (PTV). The channel's main programming is solely focused on Filipino Muslims and other Islamic communities in the Philippines.

Minor television networks
All TV: is a TV station owned and operated by Advanced Media Broadcasting System. Its broadcast facilities and studios are located at the Starmalls EDSA Complex, EDSA corner Shaw Boulevard, Mandaluyong City.
ALIW Channel 23: is a Philippine free-to-air digital broadcast television network based in Pasig, with its studios located at the Citystate Centre in Shaw Boulevard. It serves as the flagship television property of Aliw Broadcasting Corporation.
 Net 25: is a television network owned and operated by Eagle Broadcasting Corporation. The network is named for its flagship station in Metro Manila, DZEC-DTV, which is carried on UHF channel 28 on digital terrestrial TV and has carried by major cable operators in the country. The station's broadcast facilities are located at EBC Building #25 Central Ave., Barangay Culiat, New Era, Quezon City.
 UNTV: is the flagship television network of the Progressive Broadcasting Corporation (known on air as UNTV-PBC). Together with Breakthrough and Milestones Productions International (known on air as UNTV-BMPI), the network's content provider and marketing arm and Christian religious organization Members Church of God International (MCGI), its major blocktimer. DWAO-TV is one of very few NTSC-System M stations in the world that broadcast on Ultra High Frequency (UHF) Channel 37. In 2019, UNTV transferred its studios from the old UNTV Building at 907 EDSA Quezon City to La Verdad Christian College (LVCC) Caloocan Building, 351 EDSA, Brgy. Bagong Barrio West, Caloocan. UNTV transmitter is located at Emerald Hills, Sumulong Highway in Antipolo, Rizal. The 16-storey UNTV Broadcast Center, also referred to as The Millennial Tower and now called The Philippine Broadcast Hub along EDSA Philam is currently under construction to serve as its new headquarters. 
 SMNI: is a news and public affairs television network based in Makati City. It is owned and operated by Swara Sug Media Corporation, the parent company of Sonshine Media Network International, a religious broadcasting arm of the Kingdom of Jesus Christ (KJC) led by Filipino televangelist and church leader Pastor Apollo C. Quiboloy.
 Southern Broadcasting Network (SBN) (currently carries SolarFlix): is a Filipino-owned media company based radio and television network based in Metro Manila. SBN is a subsidiary of Solar Entertainment Corporation, a Filipino-owned television company managed by the Tieng family.
 BEAM TV: is a telecommunications company in the Philippines with primary focus on UHF broadcasting and digital terrestrial television for the convergence of multimedia. It is owned by Bethlehem Holdings, Inc., a media investment company of Globe Telecom through its Retirement Fund group.
PIE (TV channel): is a Philippine free-to-air television channel co-owned by ABS-CBN Corporation (operates as its main content provider), Kroma Entertainment and 917Ventures, in partnership with Broadcast Enterprises and Affiliated Media. 
 RJTV: is a Philippine television and radio network owned by guitarist-singer-businessman Ramon "RJ" Jacinto. The network's studio headquarters located at Ventures I Bldg., Makati Ave. cor. Gen. Luna St., Makati.

Specialty channels
 Heart of Asia Channel: known on-air as Heart of Asia, is a Philippine free-to-air television channel owned by GMA Network Inc. The channel was on test broadcast from June 12–28, 2020; and was officially launched on June 29, 2020.
Hallypop: is a Philippine free-to-air television channel owned by American company Jungo TV in partnership with GMA Network Inc.
I Heart Movies: is a Philippine free-to-air television channel owned by GMA Network Inc. The channel was on test broadcast from March 22, 2021 until March 31, 2021, and was officially launched on April 5, 2021.
One PH: is a 24/7 Filipino-language teleradio news channel owned by MediaQuest Holdings, Inc. through Cignal TV. It was soft launched on February 18, 2019 and was officially launched on July 31, 2019, on satellite provider Cignal. and also on May 22 2020, the channel is officially added to TV5's Digital Sub-channel via Channel 18 and 51.

Religious television networks
TV Maria: is a national Catholic television channel broadcasting from Manila, Philippines. Owned by TV Maria Foundation Philippines (a non-profit, non-stock organization under the Catholic Bishops' Conference of the Philippines and the Roman Catholic Archdiocese of Manila), it airs 24 hours a day and is currently available on major and provincial cable operators, on digital terrestrial television broadcasts via RJ Digital TV's DTT subchannel in Mega Manila and via GNN's DTT subchannel. 
 Truth Channel (formerly known as Ang Dating Daan Television or ADDTV) is a Philippine religious television network founded on 2014 as ADDTV and then launched on September 3, 2017 as Truth Channel. It is the flagship television network of the Members Church of God International (MCGI), together with UNTV News and Rescue, the network's carrier on free-to-air digital terrestrial television (DTT). It is known for its broadcast of Itanong mo kay Soriano and Ang Dating Daan hosted by International Televangelist Bro. Eli Soriano and Kuya Daniel Razon. It broadcasts 24 hours a day on Ultra High Frequency (UHF) Channel 38 in Metro and Mega Manila, Rizal, Bulacan, Pampanga, Laguna, Cavite and some parts of Tarlac.
 INC TV (Christian Era Broadcasting Service International): s the flagship UHF television station of Christian Era Broadcasting Service International, a broadcast ministry of the independent Philippine Christian church, the Iglesia ni Cristo. INC TV studios and transmitters are located at Redeemer Street, Milton Hills Subdivision, Brgy. New Era, Quezon City.
 Hope Channel Philippines (Seventh-day Adventist Church, Gateway UHF Television Broadcasting): is a religious network of the Seventh-day Adventist Church in the Philippines. Its TV stations are owned by Gateway UHF Television Broadcasting, while its radio stations are owned by Digital Broadcasting Corporation. Founded and launched on September 26, 2010, in the South Philippines (its main service broadcast provider), and in January 2011 in Luzon and Visayas. 
 Sonshine Media Network International (Kingdom of Jesus Christ, Swara Sug Media Corporation): is the official broadcasting arm of the Kingdom of Jesus Christ (KJC) led by the Filipino church leader and televangelist Pastor Apollo C. Quiboloy. Based in Davao City
 Light TV (Jesus Is Lord Church): is a UHF digital television station of ZOE Broadcasting Network. DZOZ-DTV studios are located at the 22nd Floor, Strata 2000 Bldg., Emerald Ave., Ortigas Center, Pasig. Its transmitter is located at ZOE Compound Center, Crestview Heights Subdivision, Barangay San Roque, Antipolo, Rizal.

Regional television networks

Defunct/Inactive television network(s)
 ABS-CBN: Prior to its shutdown, ABS-CBN was the first, oldest and largest television network in the country and it is owned and controlled by the Lopez Group of Companies. The network was launched on October 23, 1953, as Alto Broadcasting System (ABS) on DZAQ-TV Channel 3 by Antonio Quirino and James Lindenberg. ABS was soon acquired by the owner of Chronicle Broadcasting Network (CBN), Don Eugenio Lopez Sr. on February 24, 1957, with CBN launched its own TV station on DZXL-TV Channel 9 a year later. In 1961, ABS and CBN merged to form as ABS-CBN and became the Philippines' largest network. On May 5, 2020, the network was ordered to stop broadcasting by the National Telecommunications Commission after its franchise expired. On July 10, 2020, the Philippine Congress rejected its franchise renewal due to alleged violations in their franchise and other legal issues such as failure to regularize employees, using pay-per-view channel in free-to-air franchise, and alleged political meddling and bias during 2016 elections. Prior to this, President Rodrigo Duterte himself accused ABS-CBN for allegedly being biased against his administration and vowed to block the renewal of their franchise. But critics of his administration, human rights groups and several media unions said that the shutdown of ABS-CBN is an attack on press freedom and democracy in the country. The network operations was also stopped by then-President Ferdinand Marcos on September 23, 1972, when he declared martial law until its return on the airwaves on September 14, 1986 (a few months after the ousting of Marcos during the People Power Revolution).
 Banahaw Broadcasting Corporation (BBC)
 ABS-CBN Sports and Action (S+A)

See also
Digital television in the Philippines
List of analog television stations in the Philippines
List of digital television stations in the Philippines
Subscription television in the Philippines
Philippine television drama

References
  Text in this article was copied from History of The Philippine Television at the Pinoy TV Radio wiki, which is released under a Creative Commons Attribution-Share Alike 3.0 (Unported) (CC-BY-SA 3.0) license.

 
Wikipedia articles needing factual verification from November 2015